The 2014 Indiana Hoosiers men's soccer team was the college's 42nd season of playing organized men's college soccer. The Hoosiers entered the season as the defending Big Ten Champions.

Background 
Despite finishing fifth in the 2013 regular season, Indiana won the Big Ten Tournament final against Michigan State. Indiana lost in the first round of the 2013 NCAA Tournament to Akron.

Roster

Competitions

Preseason

Regular season

Big Ten Standings

Match results

Big Ten Tournament

NCAA Tournament

Statistics

Transfers

Out

See also 
2014 Big Ten Conference men's soccer season
2014 Big Ten Conference Men's Soccer Tournament
2014 NCAA Division I Men's Soccer Championship

References 

Indiana Hoosiers
Indiana Hoosiers men's soccer seasons
Indiana Hoosiers, Soccer
Indiana Hoosiers
Indiana Hoosiers